Klinikum Großhadern is an U-Bahn station in Munich on the U6 line of the Munich Underground system serving the LMU Klinikum – Campus Großhadern hospital (formerly known as Klinikum Großhadern) and nearby student accommodation.

See also
List of Munich U-Bahn stations

References

External links

Munich U-Bahn stations
Railway stations in Germany opened in 1993
Transport infrastructure completed in 1993